Sinnflut is a German band. The name means flood of sense. The pronunciation is similar to the Great Flood and plays with meaning of the church.

History
From its beginning, Sinnflut has had only two members - Magnus Bartsch, songwriter, vocalist and  piano player, and Manuel Bartsch, songwriter, vocalist, lyricist and programmer. The band is mostly associated with "Neue Deutsche Todeskunst" (New German Death Art) along with Das Ich and Relatives Menschsein. Since their first release "Vergessene Melodien" they were valid as sleeper in their genre.

Other work
Manuel Bartsch also wrote the soundtrack for The Alps Experience - Across the Alps on a mountainbike, a documentary film by Roland Schymik (2004, 2007).

Discography
 2021 - SCHNEE
2008 - Epik
 2004 - Im Anblick meines Augenblicks
 2003 - GEFÜGE 1
 2003 - GEFÜGE 2
 2001 - Das Vermächtnis
 2001 - Wortlosigkeit
 2000 - Vergessene Melodien

Sampler
 2005 Voices of Darkness II
 2004 SL-Sampler 1
 2004 Voices of Darkness
 2002 Astan Sampler 15

Articles
 Amboss-Mag (Reviews, Interviews)
 Obliveon (Reviews, Interviews)
 Darkweb (Review)

External links
 
 The Alps Experience

German dark wave musical groups
German electronic music groups
Neue Deutsche Todeskunst groups